Ghosts of Mississippi is a 1996 American biographical courtroom drama film directed by Rob Reiner and starring Alec Baldwin, Whoopi Goldberg, and James Woods. The plot is based on the true story of the 1994 trial of Byron De La Beckwith, the white supremacist accused of the 1963 assassination of civil rights activist Medgar Evers.

James Woods was nominated for an Academy Award for Best Supporting Actor for his role of Byron De La Beckwith, but lost to Cuba Gooding Jr. The original music score was composed by Marc Shaiman and the cinematography is by John Seale.

Plot
Medgar Evers was an African-American civil rights activist in Mississippi murdered on June 12, 1963. It was suspected that Byron De La Beckwith, a white supremacist, was the murderer. He had been tried twice in the 1960s and both trials ended in hung juries. Evers' widow Myrlie Evers had been trying to bring De La Beckwith to justice for over 25 years.

In 1989, emboldened by a newspaper article by Jerry Mitchell exposing jury tampering by the Mississippi State Sovereignty Commission in the first two trials, Myrlie Evers believed she had what it takes to bring him to trial again. Although most of the evidence from the old trial had disappeared, Bobby DeLaughter, an assistant District Attorney, decided to help her despite being warned that it might hurt his political aspirations and despite the strain that it caused in his marriage. DeLaughter forms a team of investigators from his office, however, the investigation suffers many setbacks.

After learning that several of the key witnesses have died, and the court transcript of their testimony from the 1960s trials is lost, the team is convinced this is a futile effort. This is re-inforced when DeLaughter fails at a desperate strategy of convincing two police officers who provided De La Beckwith with an alibi in the 1960s trials to admit they lied under oath. However, their pessimism fades with two discoveries. The rifle used in the murder, thought to have been lost, was hiding in plain sight. Later, one of the investigators learns of the existence of a witness unknown to the prosecution in the 1960s trials, Delmar Dennis. Dennis was a former member of the Ku Klux Klan who agreed to be an undercover informant for the FBI. Dennis testified against the Klan in the Mississippi Burning case, and once mentioned having met De La Beckwith. The investigation turns to finding Dennis, who was living in hiding since turning state's evidence on the KKK, to see what he knows of the case.

Once confirming that Dennis indeed had met De La Beckwith, the team is optimistic they have enough to secure a new indictment. As knowledge becomes public that the district attorney's office has re-opened the case, white supremacist elements threaten DeLaughter and his children, having by this time separated from his wife. After committing to Myrlie that he will try De La Beckwith again, Myrlie, initially skeptical of DeLaughter, reveals that she has a court certified transcript of one of the 1960s trails in her possession. DeLaughter had long sought such a transcript to be able to read testimony from deceased witnesses to the jury for the new trial. DeLaughter mostly presents the same case as was presented in the 1960s trial, except using Dennis and two other witnesses to testify as substitutes for deceased witnesses, and having Detective Lloyd Bennett read the testimony of his father, Detective LC Bennett, the officer who found the murder weapon while searching the crime scene, to the jury.

In 1994, Byron De La Beckwith was found guilty and sentenced to life imprisonment. The film ends with Myrlie tearfully rejoicing to the assembled crowd at the courthouse that she never gave up in the fight for justice for Medgar.

Cast

Music
The soundtrack of the film, with a score by Marc Shaiman, featured two versions of the Billy Taylor composition "I Wish I Knew How It Would Feel to Be Free" – one sung by Dionne Farris and the other by Nina Simone – as well as numbers by Muddy Waters, Tony Bennett, Robert Johnson and B.B. King.

Reception
The film received mixed reviews from critics, with praises going to Goldberg and Woods. Rotten Tomatoes gave it a 43% approval rating based on 30 reviews, with an average rating of 5.70/10. The site's consensus states: "James Woods is convincing as a white supremacist, but everything else rings false in this courtroom drama, which examines a weighty subject from the least interesting perspective." Audiences polled by CinemaScore gave the film an average grade of "A-" on an A+ to F scale. Gene Siskel and Roger Ebert both gave the film two thumbs down.

The film was not a financial success, making less than half of its budget back.

Accolades

See also
 Civil rights movement in popular culture
 Culture of Mississippi

References

External links
 
 
 

1996 films
1996 drama films
1990s legal films
African-American biographical dramas
American films based on actual events
American courtroom films
American legal drama films
Films about racism
Films about activists
Films about lawyers
Films about miscarriage of justice
Films directed by Rob Reiner
Films scored by Marc Shaiman
Films set in Mississippi
Films shot in Mississippi
Castle Rock Entertainment films
Columbia Pictures films
Civil rights movement in film
1990s English-language films
1990s American films